Patna College is a constituent state aided College of Patna University which was established in 1863 during the British Raj. It offers undergraduate and postgraduate courses in science, arts and commerce as well as some vocational courses like BBA, BMC and BCA. The college is affiliated to Patna University. It is also considered to be the oldest institution of higher education in Bihar.

History 
Patna College is the oldest institution of higher education in Bihar. Nearly every major college of Patna- Patna Law College, Engineering College (National Institute of Technology, Patna at present), Patna Science College and Vanijya Mahavidyala, has their roots from this college. Patna College was established on 9 January 1863, during the British Raj.

After the split-up of old Patna University into Patna University and Bihar University on 2 January 1952, the institution saw a significant shift. Until January 1952, the college was a government college and it functioned as an independent unit, but later it became an implied college of Patna University and became responsible only for Undergraduate studies due to the shifting of the burden of Post-graduate learning on University. After the centralization of two years of special honours-teaching, the honours of all art subjects remained in this college. Honours teaching was carried out by the nominated teachers of the Faculty of Arts from all the colleges of the university. In the first two hours, the students of Arts of Honors classes, of other colleges also used to come to study in this college.

But due to the gradual increase in the number of students, up to the end of the eighth decade, honours classes of various art courses were conducted in their respective colleges.

In 1957, all but the Geography, Sociology and Psychology post-graduate departments were shifted to Darbhanga House. However many teachers of Patna College still have been bearing the responsibility of postgraduate education by attending the departments in Darbhanga House.

There is hardly any change in post-operative activities. Maximum old councils, clubs as well as hostels are still under the Principal of the college.

On 9 September 1974, the Economics department was split from the Patna College and it took form into Vanijya Mahavidyala. Presently Vanijya Mahavidyala is in the college's yard itself.

Patna College is the first college in Bihar that celebrated the centenary ceremony in 1963 itself.

The college is also associated with E. M. Forster's novel, A Passage to India. According to Adwaita P. Ganguly, the institution known as Chandrapore College in the novel is "a replica of Patna College". Forster met Charles Russell and V. H. Jackson, who were professors of the college, in the course of writing his novel, A Passage to India. Forster had collected Hiuen Tsang's Indian Diary from Russell before he made his visit to Barabar Caves that appear as an important location in the novel. A hostel in the campus of the college is named after Jackson.

The legendary filmmaker, Satyajit Ray, used the picturesque campus of the college for his award-winning film, Seemabaddha.

Campus and buildings 

The administrative block of the college is the oldest of all the buildings. It used to be the site for an opium storehouse and a Dutch factory in the 17th century, much before the college was started. Other buildings were constructed gradually over a period of time.

Some of these are the western wing (1871), the eastern (1880), the portico and the present BA lecture theater (1882) connected with the main building by the long western corridor named after principal Ewbank. Later the hostels like Jackson, Minto, New and Iqbal and quarters for the principal and professors were constructed.

The college building has been declared to be a heritage site by the Archaeological Survey of India.

Departments

Arts & Commerce 

 English
 Hindi
 Urdu
 Maithili
 Bangla
 Sanskrit
 Arabic
 Farsi(Persian)
 History
 Political Science
 Economics
 Psychology
 Philosophy
 Sociology
 Geography
 Mass Communication
 Ancient Indian history and Archaeology

150th anniversary 
A number of celebrations were organised during 2012 to celebrate the 150th anniversary of the college. Coinciding with the anniversary is the centenary of the Bihar Legislative Council, which held its first session in the seminar hall of Patna college in 1913 and returned there to mark the occasion on 20 January 2012.

Notable alumni 

HMJ Sir Khan Bahadur Khuda bakhsh - Eminent Historian, Advocate and Former Chief Justice of Nizam's Hyderabad State, Founder of Khuda Bakhsh Oriental Library
Ramdhari Singh Dinkar-The Hindi poet of national eminence.
Annada Shankar Ray – Noted Bengali novelist and an early Indian ICS
Ram Sharan Sharma – Reputed Historian, former chairman, Indian History Congress, Former Head, Dept. of History, Delhi University
Jayaprakash Narayan- Known for his Concept of ‘Total Revolution’.
B C Roy (1897–1901) – First Chief Minister of West Bengal after Independence.
Sachchidananda Sinha (1892) – One of the makers of Modern Bihar, first Chairman of Constituent Assembly of India.
Krishna Sinha – First Chief Minister of Bihar after Independence.
Anugrah Narayan Sinha – Regarded among foremost builders of Bihar and first Deputy Chief Minister of Bihar.
Bhuvaneshwar Prasad Sinha – Chief Justice of Patna High Court (1943) and Chief Justice of India (1959).
Kishore Kunal- IPS (Retd.), Ex-Vice Chancellor, K S S University, Darbhanga.
Ganesh Dutt(1895) – a Venerated personality of Modern Bihar
Uday Narayan Choudhary- Speaker, Bihar Vidhan Sabha
Mahendra Prasad- Member, Rajya Sabha
Binod Kumar Roy, Chief Justice of three High Courts of India

Notable faculty 
Ram Sharan Sharma, historian, and also an alumnus of the college.
R. K. Sinha, English,

References

Bibliography 



Colleges affiliated to Patna University
Universities and colleges in Patna
Educational institutions established in 1863
1863 establishments in India